Railroad of Hope is a 2002 Chinese documentary film directed by Ning Ying. The film was produced by Eurasia Communications and Beijing Happy Village.

Background 
Railroad of Hope consists of interviews and footage collected over three days by Ning Ying of migrant agricultural workers traveling from Sichuan in China's interior, to the Xinjiang Autonomous Region, China's northwest frontier. Through informal interviews aboard the cramped rail cars, Ning Ying explores the hopes and dreams of the workers, many of whom have never left their homes before.

Reception 
The film won the Grand Prix du Cinemá du Réel in 2002 in Paris.

References

External links 

Railroad of Hope at the Chinese Movie Database

2002 films
Chinese documentary films
2000s Mandarin-language films
2002 documentary films
Documentary films about rail transport
Films directed by Ning Ying
2000s Chinese films